The Serra Mariola Natural Park is a mountain range in the Valencian Community, Spain, one of the most peripheral offsprings of the Baetic System. Most of its territory is included in a natural park founded in 2002, covering an area of 17,257 ha. The park is surrounded by the towns of Cocentaina and Bocairent and the cities of Ontinyent and Alcoy. 

It has a rectangular shape and altitudes higher than 1,000 metres, the highest peak being the Montcabrer, at 1,389 metres high. To the north the Benicadell Mountain Range has a peak bearing the same name and is 1,104 metres high. The Serra is predominantly composed of limestone. The climate is largely Mediterranean.

Covering these mountain ranges are some 200 or more different aromatic and medicinal plants with hundreds of different trees, which include a variety of yew unique to this area.

See also 

Font Roja Natural Park

References

External links

Serra Mariola Natural Park (Spanish, Valencian)

Baetic System
Green Spain
Natural parks of Spain
Natural parks of the Valencian Community
Mariola
Protected areas of the Valencian Community
Protected areas established in 2002
Geography of the Province of Alicante
Mariola
Alcoy